Ángel Guirola (5 August 1826 – 27 April 1910) was a Salvadoran politician who served as the acting president of El Salvador in 1884 and as the president of the Legislative Assembly in 1884 and 1885.

Biography 

Ángel Guirola was born in Zacatecoluca, Federal Republic of Central America, on 5 August 1826. His parents were Rafael María Guírola and Gertrudis de la Cotera y González. He married Cordelia Duke Alexander in 1859 in New York City. He had seven children: Adalberto (who died during the Third Totoposte War, Rafael, Ángel, Eduardo, Julia, Lulú, and Matilde.

Guirola was elected as the mayor of San Vicente in 1852. He was elected as a deputy to the Legislative Assembly in 1866 from the department of San Salvador. He served as the president of the Legislative Assembly from 19 January 1884 to 29 February 1884, and again from 14 January 1885 to 29 May 1885. Additionally, he was installed as the acting president of El Salvador from 6 April 1884 to 21 August 1884 while President Rafael Zaldívar was on an official visit to Europe. Guirola resigned from the legislature in 1885 and left the country for the United States and Europe.

He died on 27 April 1910 in Santa Tecla, El Salvador.

References 

1826 births
1910 deaths